Henry Gwiazda (born 1952, silent i) is a composer who specializes in virtual audio, the simulation of a three-dimensional sound space in either headphones or precisely positioned speakers. He composes what may be called musique concrète, using samples usually without “tinker[ing]” with them.

Gwiazda is credited with sound effects, sampler, electric guitar and voice. He also composed, published, produced and engineered. Focal Point 3D Audio by Bo Gehring.

"Gwiazda produces 'animated' audioscapes, oddly situating twisted and chopped real-sound samples . . . combining elements that don't have any clear relationship into compositions of surprising unity." - reviewed in CMJ by Robin Edgerton Douglas Wolk.

Gwiazda studied at the Eastman School of Music, and at the Hartt School (University of Hartford), where he was a student of Arnold Franchetti.

Recordings
The CD , contains the following compositions:
  (1990)
  (1989)
  (1992)
  (1990)
  (1991), Jeffrey Krieger, electronic cello
  (1995), virtual audio-for headphones only, Ann LaBerge, electronic flute
 Speaker Placement Instructions
  (1994), virtual audio-for speakers only
 Un Nuit Dystopia/Hommage Michel Foucault (2007)

Further reading
Zelli, Bijan. “Reale und virtuelle Räume in der Computermusik: Theorien, Systeme, Analysen.” Unpublished Doctoral dissertation. Kommunikations- und Geschichtswissenschaften der Technischen Universität Berlin, 2001. — Includes an analysis of Henry Gwiazda’s buzzingreynold’sdreamland (in German)
Zelli, Bijan. “The Choreography of Noise: Analysis of Henry Gwiazda’s “buzzingreynold’sdreamland”.” eContact! 14.4 — TES 2011: Toronto Electroacoustic Symposium / Symposium électroacoustique de Toronto (March 2013). Montréal: CEC.

External links
Official website
Henry Gwiazda page on Innova Recordings website

1952 births
20th-century classical composers
21st-century classical composers
American male classical composers
American classical composers
Living people
Eastman School of Music alumni
University of Hartford Hartt School alumni
21st-century American composers
20th-century American composers
20th-century American male musicians
21st-century American male musicians